Veronica Bawuah (born 5 December 1967) is a Ghanaian sprinter. She competed in the 4 × 100 metres relay at the 1988 Summer Olympics and the 2000 Summer Olympics.

References

External links
 

1967 births
Living people
Athletes (track and field) at the 1988 Summer Olympics
Athletes (track and field) at the 2000 Summer Olympics
Ghanaian female sprinters
Olympic athletes of Ghana
Athletes (track and field) at the 1998 Commonwealth Games
Commonwealth Games competitors for Ghana
Athletes (track and field) at the 1999 All-Africa Games
Place of birth missing (living people)
African Games competitors for Ghana
Olympic female sprinters